Euphorbia mandravioky is a species of plant in the family Euphorbiaceae. It is endemic to Madagascar.  Its natural habitats are subtropical or tropical dry forests and rocky areas. It is threatened by habitat loss.

References

Endemic flora of Madagascar
mandravioky
Endangered plants
Taxonomy articles created by Polbot